Milan Vukašinović (Serbian Cyrillic: Милан Вукашиновић; born 1982) is a Serbian football forward.

Career
Vukašinović led FK Mladi Radnik in scoring during the 2010–11 season with 11 goals.

References

External links
 Profile on Youtube

1982 births
Date of birth missing (living people)
Living people
People from Bor, Serbia
Serbian footballers
Association football forwards
Serbian expatriate footballers
Expatriate footballers in Romania
FK Radnički Obrenovac players
FK Hajduk Beograd players
FK BASK players
FK Čukarički players
FK Voždovac players
FC CFR Timișoara players
FK Srem players
FK Mladi Radnik players
FK Radnički 1923 players
FK Smederevo players
Serbian SuperLiga players